The autostrada A6 in Poland is a short motorway that starts at the Polish/German border at Kołbaskowo/Pomellen connecting to the German A11 autobahn. It forms a southern bypass of the Szczecin metropolitan area and terminates at Rzęśnica interchange to the east of the city, from where it continues in an expressway standard as S3 towards Świnoujście and S6 towards Gdańsk.
The motorway is part of the European route E28.

History

The 1930s (construction)
The motorway had its beginning as part of the Reichsautobahn system built by Germany in the 1930s, as part of a planned motorway connection from Berlin through the "Polish Corridor" to Königsberg in East Prussia (now Kaliningrad, Russia). Construction works proceeded up to Rummelsburg (Miastko) after the 1939 Invasion of Poland but finally discontinued in 1942 because of the impact of World War II. After the war, the highway sections that, together with the surrounding area, became a part of Poland were dubbed Berlinka. The post-1945 borders meant that the need for a high-capacity road connection on that route disappeared. Even though much of the construction work had already been completed, it was not continued by the postwar Polish government.

Of the portion that ended up on Polish territory, only a  stretch east from the Oder-Neisse line border with Germany was fully completed as a dual-carriageway autobahn (in 1936-1937, which became the A6 of today. Further east, for another , one finds a partially completed, single-lane motorway, signed as voivodeship road 142 (part of it has been reconstructed to also serve as an emergency military road airstrip). Further east, the road is no longer passable, but the earthworks left from the motorway construction stretch for about  more and are easily visible on satellite photographs. While not part of the A6 in any formal sense, another part of the Berlin-Königsberg autobahn was the single carriageway section east of Elbląg (Elbing), built in prewar East Prussia and now in Poland and Russia. That stretch had been rebuilt and was opened to traffic in 2008 as express road S22.

1996 to present (reconstruction)
In the years after the war, the damage caused by wartime demolitions was repaired but not completely, as some Oder bridges were rebuilt only as a single carriageway. The motorway saw no more significant upgrade or reconstruction until the 1990s. As a result, it fell far short of modern standards and so on some maps, it was not marked as a motorway in whole or in part. Work on upgrading the highway to modern standards began in 1996, starting with the full rebuilding of Oder bridges. The first 22 km from the German border to the junction with national road 10 have been reconstructed from 1996 to 1999 and from 2005 to 2007. The eastern 6.5 km were reconstructed and then officially redesignated as A6 in 2012 to 2014 and 2017 to 2020. As of 2020, one last fragment with 0.8 km of the original prewar concrete surface remains near Kijewo interchange; it will be upgraded as part of the interchange's reconstruction.

Exit list

See also
European route E28
Expressway S6 (Poland)
Highways in Poland

External links

Photo gallery of A6
Kołbaskowo interchange 
Gryfino interchange 
Szczecin-Podjuchy interchange 
Partially completed Stargard-Szczeciński interchange, on the DW142 road 
End of passable section near Lisowo 
A6 depicted on a map from 1956 British atlas. The section east of Szczecin is incorrectly shown as an existing motorway. It actually corresponds to the portion where the construction work was well advanced, but not continued after the war.

References

Motorways in Poland